Joseph "Jodie" Wheeler (1898 - death date unknown) was an American baseball pitcher in the Negro leagues. He played with the Baltimore Black Sox in 1921 and 1923, the Bacharach Giants in 1922, and the Wilmington Potomacs in 1925.  He was released by the Potomacs in June 1925.

References

External links
 and Baseball-Reference Black Baseball stats and Seamheads

Baltimore Black Sox players
Bacharach Giants players
Wilmington Potomacs players
1898 births
Year of death missing
Baseball pitchers